The 2022–23 season is Al-Faisaly's first season back in the Saudi First Division League following their relegation from the Pro League last season in their 69th year in existence. The club will also compete in the AFC Champions League starting from the Round of 16 stage.

The season covers the period from 1 July 2022 to 30 June 2023.

Players

Squad information

Out on loan

Transfers and loans

Transfers in

Loans in

Transfers out

Loans out

Pre-season

Competitions

First Division League

League table

Results summary

Results by round

Matches
All times are local, AST (UTC+3).

AFC Champions League

Knockout phase

Statistics

Appearances
Last updated on 20 February 2023.

|-
! colspan=10 style=background:#dcdcdc; text-align:center|Goalkeepers

|-
! colspan=10 style=background:#dcdcdc; text-align:center|Defenders

|-
! colspan=10 style=background:#dcdcdc; text-align:center|Midfielders

|-
! colspan=10 style=background:#dcdcdc; text-align:center|Forwards

|-
! colspan=14 style=background:#dcdcdc; text-align:center| Players sent out on loan this season

|-
! colspan=14 style=background:#dcdcdc; text-align:center| Player who made an appearance this season but have left the club

|}

Goalscorers

Last Updated: 14 February 2023

Assists

Last Updated: 14 February 2023

Clean sheets

Last Updated: 7 February 2023

References

Al-Faisaly FC seasons
Faisaly